Prunus costata is a species of Prunus native to New Guinea. It is a tree reaching 25m, and is morphologically very similar to Prunus grisea var grisea, aside from their seeds. It flowers are borne on a raceme and have white petals only 1-3 mm long, with 20 to 35 stamens each. The numerous stamens are typically 5.5 mm long, giving the flowers a bristly appearance. P. costata flowers 3 to 4 times per year, and successfully sets fruit after most flowerings.

References

costata
Flora of New Guinea 
Plants described in 1965